This is a list of notable alumni of University of Texas School of Law, the law school of the University of Texas, located in Austin, Texas.
The University of Texas School of Law has 23,500  living alumni.

Politics
 Steve AdlerMayor of Austin
 Robert B. Andersonformer United States Secretary of Treasury; Deputy Secretary of Defense
 William R. ArcherUnited States Representative from Texas (1971–2001); Chairman of United States House Committee on Ways and Means
 James Bakerformer United States Secretary of State; former United States Secretary of Treasury; former White House Chief of Staff for President Ronald Reagan and President George H. W. Bush; Campaign Chairman of President Reagan's 1984 reelection; Campaign Chairman of President George H. W. Bush's 1988 election.
 Ben Barnesformer Lieutenant Governor of Texas; National Democratic Lobbyist
 Paul Begalapolitical consultant, commentator and former advisor to President Bill Clinton
 Lloyd Bentsenformer Secretary of the Treasury and United States Senator; former Chair of United States Senate Committee on Finance; former candidate for President of the United States and Vice President of the United States.
 Robert Lee BobbittSpeaker of the Texas House of Representatives (1927–1929), Attorney General of Texas (1929–1930), state court judge (1935–1937), chairman of the Texas Highway Department (1937–1943)
 Charles Robert Borchers (Class of 1966)district attorney of the 49th Judicial District Court, 1973-1980
 Jack BrooksU.S. Member of Congress; Chair of United States House Committee on the Judiciary Authored articles of impeachment against President Nixon.
 J. E. "Buster" Brown (Class of 1972)Texas Senator, District 17 from 1981 to 2002
 William Brownfield  Assistant Secretary of State for International Narcotics and Law Enforcement Affairs; Former United States Ambassador to Colombia; Former United States Ambassador to Venezuela; Former United States Ambassador to Chile
 James P. Buchanan  U.S. Member of Congress; Chair of the United States House Committee on Appropriations; After his death in office was succeeded by Lyndon B. Johnson.
Albert S. Burleson United States Postmaster General under President Woodrow Wilson and former Member of Congress. Instrumental in implementing President Wilson's policy to racially segregate the federal workforce. Aggressively enforced the Espionage Act during World War 1.
 George P. Bushson of Florida Governor Jeb Bush, nephew of President George W. Bush; Texas Land Commissioner, elected 2014.
 Kent Capertonlawyer, lobbyist in Austin and former state senator from Bryan
 Waggoner CarrAttorney General of Texas
 James W. Cicconi  White House Staff Secretary; General Counsel and Worldwide Head of Government Relations for AT&T
 Tom C. Clarkformer Associate Justice of the Supreme Court of the United States and United States Attorney General
 Susan Combs  Texas Comptroller of Public Accounts; Agriculture Commissioner of Texas
 John Connallyformer Governor of Texas; former Secretary of the Navy, former Secretary of the Treasury; Aide to Lyndon Johnson; Lead Democrats for Nixon; Former Candidate for President of the United States; Was seriously wounded when riding in President Kennedy's car at Dealey Plaza when  the president was assassinated. Presided over the removal of the U.S. dollar from the gold standard; Lead a major expansion of higher education in Texas. Opened previously all-male Texas A&M University to women.
 Tom Connallyformer United States Senator; Chair of Senate Foreign Relations Committee during World War II and the beginning of the Cold War; Vice-Chairman of United Nations Conference on International Organization that chartered the United Nations; Instrumental in ratification of treaty creating the North Atlantic Treaty Organization; Strong supporter of free trade and foreign policy of President Franklin D Roosevelt and President Harry S Truman
 Christi CraddickChair of the Texas Railroad Commission; (the agency that has primary regulatory authority over the Texas oil and gas industry).
 Henry CuellarUnited States Representative from Texas; member of House Democratic leadership
 Lloyd Doggettmember, U.S. Congress; Former Justice of the Texas Supreme Court
Ronnie Earle  District Attorney of Travis County (Austin) from 1977 to 2009. Indicted House Majority Leader Tom Delay for money laundering. 
 Robert C. Eckhardt  Member of Congress; Member of Texas House; Author of Texas Open Beaches Act
 Frances Tarlton "Sissy" FarentholdTexas House of Representatives, First female officeholder nominated for Vice President of the United States at the 1972 Democratic National Convention
 Pete GerenFormer Member of Congress; Former Secretary of the Army; Former Secretary of the Air Force
 Thomas Watt Gregory Former Attorney General of the United States; namesake of UT Austin Gregory Gym
 Richard Gump co-founder of international law firm Akin Gump Straus
 Kent HanceChancellor Emeritus of Texas Tech University System; Former Member of Congress who defeated George W Bush in his first Congressional race.
 Doug HarlanTexas political consultant, lawyer, educator, public official from San Antonio
 Jeb HensarlingMember of US Congress; Chair of the United States House Committee on Financial Services; Chairman of House Republican Conference; chairman of US Debt "Supercommittee"
 John Hill former Attorney General of Texas; former Chief Justice of Texas Supreme Court; Democratic Nominee for Governor of Texas in 1978
 Oveta Culp Hobby  First United States Secretary of Health and Human Services; Second woman to serve as a member of the President's Cabinet
 Thad Hutchesonformer chairman of the Texas Republican Party, U.S. Senate candidate in 1957, Houston lawyer
 Kay Bailey HutchisonUnited States Permanent Representative to NATO;former U.S. senator; Ranking Republican United States Senate Committee on Commerce, Science, and Transportation;
 David S. Johanson Chair of the U.S. International Trade Commission
 John Marvin JonesMember of Congress; Chair of United States House Committee on Agriculture; Chief Judge of United States Court of Claims; Author of many New Deal agriculture laws.
 Joe M. Kilgore1946 graduate; U.S. representative from Texas's 15th congressional district from 1955 to 1965.
 Ron Kirkformer mayor of Dallas, Texas; Former United States Trade Representative
 Cyndi Taylor Krier (Class of 1975)Texas State Senator and Bexar County Judge. First woman and first Republican to represent San Antonio in the Texas State Senate.
 Bob Lanierformer Mayor of Houston
 Brooke Lierman  Comptroller of Maryland
 Honoré Ligarde  state representative for Webb County from 1963 to 1973, businessman, lawyer, banker, civic figure
 Michael Lind  Prolific political writer; Has written and edited for Politico, Salon, New Republic, The New Yorker; Co Founder of centrist think tank -the New America Foundation
 Eddie Lucio, IIIState Representative from Texas' 38th District (Cameron County)
 George H. Mahon  Member US Congress; Chair of U.S. House Appropriations Committee; Dean of the United States House of Representatives
 Garry Mauro  Commissioner of the Texas General Land Office; Democratic Nominee for Governor of Texas in 1998
 Earle Bradford Mayfieldformer United States Senator from Texas
 Myra McDaniel  first African American Texas Secretary of State; General Counsel to Governor Mark White
 Harry McPhersonWhite House Counsel; Advisor to President Lyndon Johnson; Assistant Secretary of State for Educational and Cultural Affairs
 John T. Montford (Class of 1968)former Chancellor of Texas Tech University System, 1996-2001; member of the Texas State Senate, 1983-1996; businessman in San Antonio, since 2001
 Dan Moody former Governor of Texas; former Texas Attorney General
 William T. "Bill" Moore1949 graduate; state senator from Bryan known as the "Bull of the Brazos" and the "father of the modern Texas A&M University"
 Steve Munisteri White House Deputy Assistant to President Donald Trump; Former Chair of the Republican Party of Texas
 Pat Morris Neff  Former Governor of Texas;  Former President of Baylor University
 Covey T. Oliver  Former Assistant Secretary of State for Inter-American Affairs; Former United States Ambassador to Colombia; Former Dean of University of Pennsylvania School of Law
 Pete OlsonUnited States Congressman from Texas
 George Peddy (1920)member of the Texas House of Representatives and U.S. Senate candidate
 Federico Peñaformer Secretary of Transportation and Secretary of Energy; former Mayor of Denver
 Colonel Alfred P.C. Petsch (1887–1981)Lawyer, legislator, civic leader, philanthropist, member of Texas House of Representatives 
 Paul Pressler  Lawyer, judge, and leader of the Southern Baptist Convention Conservative resurgence
 Sam Rayburnlongest-serving Speaker of the United States House of Representatives; Mentor to President Lyndon Johnson; Chair of United States House Committee on Energy and Commerce; Before Congress served as Speaker of Texas House of Representatives
 Brooke Rollins Special Assistant to President Donald Trump for innovation. Former CEO of the Texas Public Policy Foundation. Former Policy Director to Governor Rick Perry.
 Tom Schiefferformer United States Ambassador to Japan; former United States Ambassador to Australia; President of the Texas Rangers baseball team; Co-lead effort to purchase Texas Rangers with President George W. Bush. Brother of CBS Anchor Bob Schieffer
 A. R. Schwartzformer Texas State Senator, helped author the landmark Texas Open Beaches Act
 Clay Sell  Former United States Deputy Secretary of Energy
 John Sheppardformer Attorney General of Texas
 Morris SheppardU.S. Senator, author of the Eighteenth Amendment; Chair of Senate Armed Services Committee; Senate Minority Whip
 Max Sherman (Class of 1960)former state senator and former president of West Texas A&M University and former Dean of the Lyndon B. Johnson School of Public Affairs
 Robert Allan Shiversformer Governor of Texas; former Lieutenant Governor of Texas
 Kristen SilverbergU.S. Ambassador to the European Union; former Assistant Secretary of State for International Organization Affairs
 Barry Smithermanformer member of the Texas Railroad Commission
 John Thomas Steen Jr.San Antonio lawyer and the 108th Secretary of State of Texas
 Robert Schwarz Straussformer United States Ambassador to Russia; former United States Trade Representative; United States Special Envoy for the Middle East; Former Chair of the Democratic National Committee; Founder of international law firm Akin Gump Strauss Hauer & Feld; Namesake of Robert S. Strauss Center for International Security and Law at the University of Texas at Austin; Recipient of the Presidential Medal of Freedom
 Tom Strickland  Assistant Secretary of the Interior for Fish, Wildlife and Parks; Former United States Attorney for the District of Colorado; 2002 Democratic nominee for US Senator from Colorado
 Bryan Taylor  Member of Alabama State Senate; General Counsel to Alabama Governor Kay Ivey
 Larry E. Temple White House Counsel advisor to President Lyndon Johnson; Chair of the LBJ Foundation
 Albert Thomas Member of Congress Chair of US House Democratic Caucus
 R. Ewing Thomason   Former Federal Judge United States District Court for the Western District of Texas; Member of Congress; Speaker of the Texas House of Representatives; Mayor of El Paso
 Mac ThornberryU.S. representative from Texas's 13th congressional district; Chair of United States House Committee on Armed Services
 Jim Turner  Former United States Representative; Ranking Democrat on House Homeland Security Committee
 Corbin Van Arsdaleformer state representative from District 130 in northwestern Harris County, 2003-2008; lawyer and lobbyist in Austin
 Filemon Vela Jr.  United States Representative from Texas
 Jason Villalbastate representative from District 114 in north Dallas County
 Gary Watkinsstate representative from Ector County, county administrative judge, and state district court judge.
 Bob WheelerTexas House of Representatives
 Bill Whiteformer Mayor of the City of Houston; former United States Deputy Secretary of Energy; Democratic Nominee for Governor of Texas in 2010
 Ralph Yarboroughformer United States Senator from Texas; Former Chair United States Senate Committee on Health, Education, Labor, and Pensions
 John Andrew Youngformer United States Representative from Texas
 Shelby Slawson state representative from District 59

Law
 Linda L. AddisonManaging Partner, New York, Fulbright & Jaworski L.L.P.
 Micaela Alvarez  Federal Judge Southern District of Texas
 Harriet Mitchell Murphyfirst African-American woman appointed to regular judgeship in Texas.
Lisa BlattHolds the record for most cases argued by a woman in front of the Supreme Court (40 as of 2020); Partner at Williams & Connolly
 Diane Brayton  General Counsel of the New York Times 
 David Briones  Federal Judge Western District of Texas
 William C. BrysonUnited States Circuit Judge, United States Court of Appeals for the Federal Circuit; former Solicitor General of the United States
 Greg Coleman  First Solicitor General of Texas; Founder of appellate firm Yetter Coleman LLP.
 William C. Conner (1920–2009)federal judge for the United States District Court for the Southern District of New York
 Elizabeth Ann Copeland  Judge of the US Tax Court
 Gregg Costa  Judge of the United States Court of Appeals for the Fifth Circuit; Former Assistant US Attorney who lead prosecution of famous Ponzi schemer Allen Stanford
 James DeAnda  Chief Judge of United States District Court for the Southern District of Texas; Co-Founded Texas RioGrande Legal Aid; Plaintiff's attorney in US Supreme Court case of Hernandez v Texas
 Dick DeGuerin criminal defense attorney based in Houston; Clients include David Koresh and Tom DeLay
 James A. Elkins  Founder of international energy law firm Vinson & Elkins. 
 William Royal Furgeson Jr.United States District Court Judge for the Western District of Texas. Founding Dean of University of North Texas at Dallas College of Law
 Joseph Jefferson FisherUnited States District Court Judge for the Eastern District of Texas 
 David Frederick appellate attorney; has argued 37 cases before the United States Supreme Court; Name partner in elite Washington DC litigation boutique Kellogg, Hansen, Todd, Figel & Frederick
 Gustavo C. Garcia, Carlos Cadena, James DeAndaAttorneys for 1950s civil rights case Hernandez v. Texas which determined that Hispanics have Equal Protection under the 14th Amendment
 Orlando Luis GarciaUnited States District Judge, Western District of Texas
 Bryan Garnereditor in chief of Black's Law Dictionary and author of numerous books and articles on language and writing, including "A Dictionary of Modern Legal Usage"
 Emilio M. Garza Judge United States Court of Appeals for the Fifth Circuit
 Reynaldo Guerra GarzaJudge United States Court of Appeals for the Fifth Circuit; First Hispanic American appointed to a judgeship on any United States Court of Appeals
 Yvonne Gonzalez Rogers Judge of the United States District Court for the Northern District of California
 Mike Godwinfirst attorney for the  Electronic Frontier Foundation and current general counsel for the Wikimedia Foundation
 Joe R. Greenhill Chief Justice of the Supreme Court of Texas
 Richard Gump co-founder of international law firm Akin Gump Strauss Hauer & Feld
 Hayden W. Head, Jr.Chief Judge, United States District Court for the Southern District of Texas
 Robert Scott Horton Human Rights attorney, columnist for Harper's, and adjunct professor at Columbia Law School
 Joseph Chappell Hutcheson Jr.  Judge United States Court of Appeals for the Fifth Circuit
 Joe Jamail Billionaire Trial Lawyer Known as the "King of Torts"; Won $11 billion verdict representing Pennzoil against Texaco in oral contract case.
 Edith JonesChief Justice of the Fifth Circuit Court of Appeals
 William Wayne JusticeSenior United States District Judge, Western District of Texas, United States District Judge, Eastern District of Texas, storied civil rights judge
 George P. KazenSenior United States District Judge, Southern District of Texas;
 Michael KeaslerJudge of the Texas Court of Criminal Appeals since 1999
 Ed Knight  General Counsel of NASDAQ; Former General Counsel of United States Department of Treasury
 Royce C. LamberthChief Judge United States District Court for the District of Columbia
 Debra Lehrmannformer 360th District Court Judge in Fort Worth; Texas Supreme Court Justice (2011– )
 Mike McKool  trial lawyer; Founder of litigation firm McKool Smith; Has won over $1 billion in judgments and verdicts; Represented Quincy Jones in his lawsuit against the estate of Michael Jackson over royalties for Off the Wall & Thriller 
 Thomas M. MelsheimerDallas Managing Principal for Fish & Richardson; 1986 magna cum laude graduate
 Jose Rolando Olvera Jr.  Federal Judge United States District Court for the Southern District of Texas
 James Aubrey Parker  Federal Judge United States District Court for the District of New Mexico
 David Peeples, Texas state court judge since 1981; based in San Antonio
 Robert L. Pitman  United States District Judge of the United States District Court for the Western District of Texas; Former United States Attorney for the Western District of Texas; First openly LBGT US Attorney and Federal Judge in Texas
 Jack Pope (1913-)Lawyer, judge, and Supreme Court of Texas Chief Justice 1982-1985
 Edward C. Prado  United States Ambassador to Argentina; Judge of the United States Court of Appeals for the Fifth Circuit
 Nelva Ramos  Federal Judge Southern District of Texas
 Eddie Rodriguezmember of the Texas House of Representatives
 Xavier Rodriguez  Federal Judge United States District Court for the Western District of Texas; Former Member of Texas Supreme Court
 Diana Saldana  Federal Judge Southern District of Texas
 Barefoot Sanders  Chief Judge United States District Court for the Northern District of Texas; U.S.Assistant Attorney General;United States Attorney; Democratic Nominee for United States Senate in 1972
 Jorge Antonio Solis  Chief Judge United States District Court for the Northern District of Texas
 Leslie H. Southwick  Judge United States Court of Appeals for the Fifth Circuit
 Sam Sparks Federal Judge Western District of Texas
 Joseph Tyree Sneed III  U.S. Deputy Attorney General; Judge United States Court of Appeals for the Ninth Circuit; Dean of Duke University School of Law; Father of Carly Fiorina
 Robert Schwarz Straussformer United States Ambassador to Russia; former United States Trade Representative; United States Special Envoy for the Middle East; Former Chair of the Democratic National Committee; Founder of international law firm Akin Gump Strauss Hauer & Feld; Namesake of Robert S. Strauss Center for International Security and Law at the University of Texas at Austin; Recipient of the Presidential Medal of Freedom
 Stephen Susman (J.D. 1965)  plaintiffs attorney and founding partner of Susman Godfrey
 R. Ewing Thomason  Former Federal Judge United States District Court for the Western District of Texas; Member of Congress; Speaker of the Texas House of Representatives;Mayor of El Paso
 Henry Wade  Served as Dallas County District Attorney for 30 years. Handled the criminal investigation of the assassination of President Kennedy and Lee Harvey Oswald. Was defendant in the seminal case of Roe vs Wade
 Mikal Watts  Texas trial lawyer who has won over $3 billion in settlements for his clients. 
 Sarah Weddingtonrepresented Jane Roe in the landmark Supreme Court case Roe v. Wade
 Harry WhittingtonTexas attorney famous for getting shot by Dick Cheney in a hunting incident; professionally known for eminent domain cases
 Paul Womack (J.D., 1975)Judge of the Texas Court of Criminal Appeals, 1997-2015; resides in Georgetown in Williamson County
 Diane Pamela WoodChief Judge for the United States Court of Appeals for the Seventh Circuit, considered potential candidate for a seat on the Supreme Court during the Obama administration
 John Wood  Federal District Judge who was assassinated by mob hitman Charles Harrelson, father of actor Woody Harrelson

Academia
 Leon A. Greenlong-time dean at Northwestern University School of Law and professor at UT and at Yale Law School; authored pioneering works in tort law
 Frank Shelby Groner (1877-1943) – President of the College of Marshall.
 Kent HanceChancellor Emeritus of Texas Tech University System; Former Member of Congress who defeated George W Bush in his first Congressional race.
 Herbert HovenkampProfessor of Law at the University of Iowa College of Law; prolific author and expert in Antitrust law; member of the American Academy of Arts and Sciences
 W. Page Keeton1931 graduate and Dean from 1949 to 1974; expert in Torts; Grandfather of White House Press Secretary Scott McClellan
 Thomas MenglerPresident of Saint Mary's University in San Antonio, Texas; previously, dean of the law school at University of St. Thomas; former dean at the University of Illinois College of Law
 John T. Montford (Class of 1968)former Chancellor of Texas Tech University System, 1996-2001; member of the Texas State Senate, 1983-1996; businessman in San Antonio, since 2001
 Gene Nichollaw professor at the University of North Carolina; former professor and President of the College of William and Mary; former dean of the law schools at North Carolina and Colorado
 Jack W. Nowlin  Dean of Texas Tech University School of Law
 Covey T. Oliver  Former Assistant Secretary of State for Inter-American Affairs; Former United States Ambassador to Colombia; Former Dean of University of Pennsylvania School of Law
 Joseph Tyree Sneed III  U.S. Deputy Attorney General; Judge United States Court of Appeals for the Ninth Circuit; Dean of Duke University School of Law; Father of Carly Fiorina

Business
 David R. McAtee II Senior Executive Vice President and General Counsel, AT&T Inc.
 Samuel T. BledsoePresident of Atchison, Topeka and Santa Fe Railway 1933–1939
 Kimberly S. Bowers Former CEO and Chairman of the Board of CST Brands; Listed by Fortune Magazine as one of the 50 most powerful women in business.
 William Frank Buckley Sr.  Powerful Lawyer and Oil Speculator in Mexico and Venezuela. Father of William F. Buckley Jr., Senator James L. Buckley, Grandfather of Christopher Buckley
 Adam DellPartner at Goldman Sachs; Head of Goldman Sachs personal app Marcus; Former partner in leading Venture Capital firm Austin Ventures; brother of Michael Dell
 Belinda Johnson  Chief Operating Officer of Airbnb
 Michael R. LevyFounder and Publisher of Texas Monthly magazine
 J. Hugh Liedtke and Bill Liedtkebrothers who cofounded Zapata Petroleum Corporation with President George HW Bush; acquired South Penn Oil Company which they renamed Pennzoil
 Oliver Luckformer NFL player; former executive with NFL Europa and the Houston Dynamo of Major League Soccer; current CEO and Commissioner of the XFL (2020)
 Hugh "Skip" McGee III  Former Global Head of Investment Banking at Lehman Brothers and Barclays
 Robert McGehee  Former CEO of Progress Energy
 James C. Musselman  Founder of Kosmos Energy that discovered the one billion barrel Jubilee Oil Field off the coast of Ghana. Subject of critically acclaimed documentary Big Men regarding the oil industry in Africa.
 Clay Sell  CEO of X-energy; Former President of Hunt Energy Horizons; Former United States Deputy Secretary of Energy

Non-Profit
 Kathryn S. FullerChair of the Ford Foundation and former President of the World Wildlife Fund
 Pete Geren  President of the Sid W. Richardson Foundation
 Father T. J. Martinez  Founder of Cristo Rey Jesuit College Preparatory of Houston a Jesuit High School exclusively dedicated to low income students in Houston. Inducted into Papal Knighthood Equestrian Order of the Holy Sepulchre
 Sam Simon, consumer advocate
 Darren Walker  President of the Ford Foundation

References 

University of Texas at Austin alumni
University of Texas at Austin alumni